"Falling in Love" is the fourth and final single taken from British pop rock band McFly's fourth studio album, Radio:Active. On 29 April 2009, the song was added to BBC Radio 1's C-List and BBC Radio 2's B-List. In the UK, "Falling in Love" was released to promote the Radio:Active DVD. In Brazil, the song was released officially on 7 May. An iTunes bundle, consisting of the Radio Edit and Music Video, was released on 10 May 2009. The video for the track consists of clips from the group's Radio:Active Live at Wembley DVD. The intro has a small resemblance to The Byrds' song "I'll Feel a Whole Lot Better".

Track listing
 UK Promotional Single
 "Falling in Love" (Radio Edit) – 3:31

 iTunes Download Bundle
 "Falling in Love" (Radio Edit) – 3:31
 "Falling in Love" (Video) – 3:40

Release history

Chart performance

Live Performances
Brazil
 Domingão do Faustão October 2008
 Altas Horas – October 2008
 Radio:Active Tour – October 2008
 Up Close...And This Time It's Personal Tour – May 2009
 Domingão do Faustão May 2009
U.K.
 Radio:Active Tour – November 2008
 Tonight’s The Night – April 2009
 Paul O’Grady Show – May 2009
 Hollyoaks – May 2009
 BBC Sound – May 2009
 Up Close...And This Time It's Personal Tour – April/May 2009
 BBC Switch – May 2009
 Radio 1 Chart Show – May 2009
Spain
 Under Eighteen U18 – September 2009
 Sesiones Myspace – December 2009

References

2009 singles
McFly songs
Songs written by Jason Perry (singer)
Songs written by Danny Jones
Songs written by Tom Fletcher
2008 songs
EMI Records singles